Claude Péri-Thévenard (born 9 March 1972) is a French figure skating coach and former competitor. A two-time national silver medalist, she represented France at the World Junior, World, and European Championships. In 1990, she retired from competition and began coaching at CSG Dammarie-lès-Lys. In 2012, Péri-Thévenard signed a two-year contract to serve as a national coach. As a coach, she is best known for her work with two-time French national champion Yrétha Silété, whom she coached from the age of six.

Her current students include:
 Maé-Bérénice Méité
 Vanessa James / Morgan Ciprès
 Laurine Lecavelier

Her former students include:
 Florent Amodio
 Chafik Besseghier
 Jérémie Colot
 Yrétha Silété

Competitive highlights

References 

French figure skating coaches
French female single skaters
Living people
Figure skaters from Paris
1972 births